is a Japanese football player. She plays for Urawa Reds in the WE League and Japan national team.

Club career
Naomoto was born in Ogori on March 3, 1994. In 2007, she joined her local club Fukuoka J. Anclas. After graduating from high school, she joined Urawa Reds in 2012. She was selected Best Eleven in 2014 season.

National team career
Naomoto played for Japan U-17 national team at 2010 U-17 World Cup Japan won 2nd place and U-20 team at 2012 U-20 World Cup Japan won 3rd place. On May 8, 2014, she debuted for Japan national team against New Zealand. She was a member of Japan for 2014 Asian Cup and 2014 Asian Games. Japan won the championship at Asian Cup and 2nd place at Asian Games. In 2018, she played at 2018 Asian Cup and Japan won their second consecutive title. She played 18 games for Japan.

National team statistics

International goals

Honours 
Japan
Winner
 AFC Women's Asian Cup: 2014, 2018

References

External links 

 

Japan Football Association
Profile

1994 births
Living people
University of Tsukuba alumni
Association football people from Fukuoka Prefecture
Japanese women's footballers
Japan women's international footballers
SC Freiburg (women) players
Nadeshiko League players
Fukuoka J. Anclas players
Urawa Red Diamonds Ladies players
Asian Games medalists in football
Asian Games silver medalists for Japan
Footballers at the 2014 Asian Games
Women's association football forwards
Medalists at the 2014 Asian Games
Frauen-Bundesliga players